The 2004 Florida Gators football team represented the University of Florida in the sport of American football during the 2004 NCAA Division I-A football season.  The Gators competed in Division I-A of the National Collegiate Athletic Association (NCAA) and the Eastern Division of the Southeastern Conference (SEC), and played their home games at Ben Hill Griffin Stadium on the university's Gainesville, Florida campus.  The season was the third and last for head coach Ron Zook, who led the Gators to a regular season record of 7–4 (.636).

Pre-season

For the fifth time in school history, Florida played five of its first six games at home.  Four of the last five games were on the road.  Florida's record for the two prior seasons under Zook on the road in conference play was an SEC league best 7–1.  Eight starters returned and true sophomore Chris Leak would start the first game of the season at the helm for the first time.  The Gators opened the season against Eastern Michigan from the Mid-American Conference.

Schedule

Sources: 2012 Florida Football Media Guide, and GatorZone.com.

Game summaries

Eastern Michigan

Tennessee

Kentucky

Arkansas

LSU

Middle Tennessee State

The match with MTSU was intended to be the season opener for the Gators, but was canceled and rescheduled because of Hurricane Frances. This left the Gators without a regular-season bye week.

Mississippi State

Following this loss, head coach Ron Zook was fired, but allowed to coach the remainder of the season.

Georgia

Vanderbilt

South Carolina

Florida State

Ron Zook's last game as head coach of the Florida Gators and spoiled the dedication of the field for Bobby Bowden.

Peach Bowl

Defensive coordinator Charlie Strong was interim head coach for the bowl game.

Coaching staff
 Ron Zook – head coach
 Jerry "Red" Anderson – defensive line coach
 Dan Disch – secondary coach
 Dwayne Dixon – assistant head coach / inside receivers coach
 Larry Fedora – offensive coordinator / receivers coach
 Mike Locksley – running backs coach / recruiting coordinator
 Bill Miller  – associate head coach / linebackers coach
 Charlie Strong – defensive coordinator/ interim head coach
 Joe Wickline – offensive line coach / running game coordinator
 Ed Zaunbrecher – quarterbacks coach

References

Bibliography
 2009 Southeastern Conference Football Media Guide, Florida Year-by-Year Records, Southeastern Conference, Birmingham, Alabama, p. 60 (2009).
 Carlson, Norm, University of Florida Football Vault: The History of the Florida Gators, Whitman Publishing, LLC, Atlanta, Georgia (2007).  .

Florida
Florida Gators football seasons
Florida Gators football